The Amsterdam-Gloversville-Johnstown Jags was a primary moniker of the minor league baseball teams representing the cities of Amsterdam, New York, Gloversville, New York and Johnstown, New York between 1890 and 1908. Amsterdam and Amsterdam-Gloversville-Johnstown teams played as members of the New York State League from 1894 to 1895 and 1902 to 1908.

Baseball Hall of Fame member Jack Chesbro pitched for the 1895 Johnstown Buckskins.

History
Minor league baseball began in the cities when the Johnstown–Gloversville team began play as members of the 1890 six–team Independent level New York State League. The team ended the season with a 46-46 record, placing 4th, playing under manager John Case.

Minor league baseball began in Amsterdam , as the Amsterdam Carpet Tacks won the 1894 New York State League championship. Playing in the Class B level league, the Amsterdam Carpet Tacks finished the regular season with a 30–21, playing record under managers Walter Beebe, John Bartholomew and Bart Howard. Amsterdam finished 2.5 games ahead of the 2nd place Poughkeepsie Bridge Citys and 3.5 games ahead of the 3rd place Johnstown Buckskins in the six–team league. Amsterdam pitcher Chauncey Baldwin led the league with 11 wins.

Amsterdam continued play in the 1895 New York State League. The Amsterdam Red Stockings finished with a record of 29–22, placing 2nd in the final standings. Playing under manager Tom Donovan, Amsterdam was mere percentage points behind the 1st place Binghamton Crickets in the final standings, as the league reduced from eight teams to four teams during the season.  Gloversville and Johnstown fielded teams in the 1895 league, with the Gloversville Glovers and Johnstown Buckskins teams both folding on July 4, 1895. Baseball Hall of Fame member Jack Chesbro pitched for the 1895 Johnstown Buckskins in his first professional season.

The 1902 Amsterdam–Gloversville–Johnstown Jags resumed play as members of the Class B level New York State League. The "Jags" moniker derives from the first letter of each city. The 1902 Amsterdam–Gloversville–Johnstown Jags finished last in the New York State League final standings. The Jags had a record of 29–72, to place 8th in the league under the direction of manager Tommy Dowd. The Jags finished 37.0 games behind the 1st place Albany Senators. The team played home games at Guy Park in Amsterdam, New York.

The team switched monikers in 1903, as the Amsterdam–Gloversville–Johnstown Hypens continued play in the New York State League and again finished in last place. The 1903 Hyphens finished with a record of 41–82 under managers Doc Hazelton, Dan Shannon and Clyde Williams. The Hyphens finished 33.5 games behind the 1st place Schenectady Frog Alleys.

The 1904 Hyphens began playing at both JAG Park in Gloversville and Guy Park in Amsterdam. The 1904 Amsterdam-Johnstown-Gloversville Hyphens finished 65–61, placing  4th in the New York State League under manager Howard Earl. The Hypens finished 21.5 games behind the 1st place Syracuse Stars in the final standings.

The Amsterdam–Gloversville–Johnstown Jags won the 1905 New York State League Championship. The Jags finished with a record of 71–51, placing 
1st in the New York State League final standings, 0.5 games ahead of the 2nd place Syracuse Stars. Manager Howard Earl led the team to the championship.

The 1906 Amsterdam–Gloversville–Johnstown Jags had a regular season record of 66–68. The Jags placed 5th in the New York State League standings under returning manager Howard Earl, finishing 17.5 games behind the Scranton Miners.

The Amsterdam–Gloversville–Johnstown Jags finished last in the 1907 New York State League. Their record of 39–95, left the team 8th in the league under manager Howard Earl, finishing 42.5 games behind the 1st place Albany Senators.

The Amsterdam–Gloversville–Johnstown Jags relocated in 1908 and finished last in their final season. The Jags began the season with a 1–8 record, when they dropped Amsterdam from their franchise on May 18, 1908. The Gloversville-Johnstown Jags were 11–54 on July 22, 1908, when the franchise relocated to Elmira, New York, where they finished the season as the Elmira Colonels. The team finished in 8th place with a 36–104 overall record in 1908. The managers were Hank Ramsey and Louis Bacon, as the team finished 50.5 games behind the 1st place Scranton Miners.

The cities were without a minor league team until the 1938 Amsterdam Rugmakers and Gloversville-Johnstown Glovers teams began play as members of the Class C level Canadian-American League.

The ballparks
The played minor league home games at Guy Park in Amsterdam, New York, for the duration of the Amsterdam franchises. Today, the site is the Guy Park State Historical Site.

In Gloversville, New York select home games, the team played at JAG Park.  The ballpark was rebuilt and known as "A.J.& G Baseball Park" beginning in 1906. JAG Park was designed by F.L. Comstock and built by E.A. Satterlee for $3,088. The ballpark was built on six acres of land on Harrison Street, midway between Gloversville, New York and Johnstown, New York. Today, the ballpark is called Parkhurst Field and is still in use.

Timeline

Year-by-year records

Notable alumni

Baseball Hall of Fame alumni
Jack Chesbro (1895) Inducted, 1946

Notable alumni
George Bell (1904–1905)
Frank Bird (1890)
Joe Birmingham (1906)
Pete Childs (1902, 1904–1907)
Jim Devlin (1895)
Tom Donovan (1895)
Tommy Dowd (1902, MGR)
Bull Durham (1903)
Howard Earl (1904–1907, MGR)
Harry Fuller (1894)
Billy Ging (1902–1904)
Gene Good (1907)
Doc Hazelton (1902), (1903, MGR)
Mike Hickey (1894)
Ed Hilley (1904–1906)
Charlie Malay (1902–1904)
Charlie McCullough (1890)
Sandy McDougal (1902–1903)
Jim McGuire (1895)
Harry McNeal (1907)
Frank McPartlin (1894)
Tom Messitt (1895)
Doc Oberlander (1890)
George Sharrott (1894)
George Shoch (1905)
Hank Simon (1905)
Jack Slattery (1902)
Deke White (1894)

See also
Amsterdam Carpet Tacks playersAmsterdam Red Stockings playersAmsterdam-Gloversville-Johnstown Hyphens playersAmsterdam-Gloversville-Johnstown Jags playersGloversville Glovers playersJohnstown Buckskins players

References

External links
 Baseball Reference

Defunct minor league baseball teams
Defunct baseball teams in New York (state)
New York State League teams
Fulton County, New York
Montgomery County, New York
Baseball teams established in 1902
Baseball teams disestablished in 1908
Professional baseball teams in New York (state)